The 13th Goya Awards were presented in Madrid, Spain on 23 January 1999.

The Girl of Your Dreams won the award for Best Film.

Winners and nominees

Major award nominees

Other award nominees

Honorary Goya
 Rafael Alonso

References

13
1998 film awards
1998 in Spanish cinema